Nox Aeris is the fourth studio album by rock band Janus.  The album was released on March 27, 2012.  The song "Stains" peaked at No.26 on the Billboard Mainstream Rock Chart.

The album title is Latin for "night air" and stems from the Black Death-era belief that going outdoors at night made people susceptible to the disease. Two slightly different album covers were released, depicting a person with a plague mask.

Track listing 
 In Flames - 3:17
 Stains - 3:36
 Lifeless - 3:36
 Promise To No One - 3:37
 Pound Of Flesh - 3:08
 Waive - 3:36
 Stray - 4:24
 Numb - 3:28
 Always Rains - 5:02
 Polarized - 3:06

Deluxe edition tracks
11. Numb (Acoustic) - 3:38
12. Stains (Acoustic) - 3:43

Charts

References

External links 

Janus (American band) albums